Andris Vilks (born 15 June 1963) is a Latvian politician, member of the Unity party, and Minister of Finance of Latvia from 2010 until 2014.

References

1963 births
Living people
People from Cēsis Municipality
Civic Union (Latvia) politicians
New Unity politicians
Ministers of Finance of Latvia
Deputies of the 10th Saeima
Deputies of the 11th Saeima
University of Latvia alumni
Recipients of the Order of the Cross of Terra Mariana, 2nd Class